The  is a Japanese anime song music competition, organized by Animax, in association with Jupiter Telecommunications.

Outline
The annual competition is first held across a series of preliminaries in several Japanese cities, with the chosen finalists performing at a final round, which will be broadcast across Japan on Animax, where they will be judged by a panel of celebrity judges, music producers and record company executives, including noted singers Ichirō Mizuki, Mitsuko Horie and Yumi Matsuzawa. The winner of the competition will subsequently perform a theme song to an Animax anime project as their debut and earn a professional contract with Sony Music Japan.

History
The first Animax All-Japan Anison Grand Prix was held in July 2007, with preliminaries taking place across Tokyo, Osaka, Fukuoka and Sapporo, and was attended by 1792 applicants. The winner of the competition was Shūhei Kita, who subsequently performed "Breakin' Through", the opening theme to the anime series Persona: Trinity Soul as his debut, and earned a professional contract with Sony Music Japan. Kita subsequently also performed "Issei no Sei", the opening theme to the Natsume Yūjin-Chō anime series in 2008.

The second competition, in 2008, was attended by 3186 applicants, with preliminaries held across Tokyo, Osaka, Nagoya, Fukuoka and Sapporo, with eleven chosen finalists performing at the final round, held in JCB Hall in Tokyo in September 2008, and was won by the Tokyo-based Canadian Catherine St. Onge, who will perform the theme song, produced by Shintarō Tokita of Sukima Switch, to an Animax anime project, and earn a professional contract with Sony Music Japan. In the first round, she performed Silly-go-round from .hack//Roots, while in the second round, she performed Adesso e Fortuna ~Honō to Eien~ from Record of Lodoss War. Animax subsequently broadcast the "2nd All-Japan Anison Grand Prix Special", marking its tenth anniversary, on November 16, 2008, featuring live performances by judge and noted anime singer Ichiro Mizuki, idol group AKB48 and singers Akira Kushida, Nana Kitade, the previous competition's winner Shūhei Kita, and numerous others.

In February 2009, it was announced that St. Onge, under her chosen moniker Himeka, would perform the theme song, produced by Tokita of Sukima Switch, to the anime adaptation of Valkyria Chronicles (a.k.a. Senjō no Valkyria: Gallian Chronicles), which will air from April 2009, across Animax and other Japanese broadcast networks.

Event schedule

※Finals are held in Tokyo.

See also

 List of animation awards

References

External links
Animax official website 

Animax
Aniplex
Sony Music Entertainment Japan
Japanese music awards
Anime awards
Awards established in 2007
2007 establishments in Japan
Recurring events established in 2007
Annual events in Japan